Confessions or The Annabel Trilogy Part III: Confessions (on Re-release edition) is the fifth studio album by American post-hardcore band, Alesana. It is their third concept album and the final chapter of the Annabel trilogy, released on April 21, 2015. The first one, The Emptiness  (Fearless Records) was released in 2010, and the second one, A Place Where the Sun Is Silent (Epitaph Records) was released in 2011.

Background
This is the third and final release of the three studio albums and accompanying short stories that make up Alesana's iconic Annabel Trilogy, a three part story centered around the fictional character Annabel and how she interacts with various storylines and motifs found in famous works of literature. The trilogy debuted with 2010's The Emptiness which was based on the works of Edgar Allan Poe and was followed by 2011's A Place Where the Sun is Silent, based on Dante's Divine Comedy.

To create this record, Alesana got to pursue many things they were limited from with their past records, including releasing the album through Milke's own label, Revival Recordings. "[Recording through Revival] is completely different in every way possible," says Milke, "and thusly far more rewarding. I am trying to build a culture and platform for other artists to realize their own potential and dreams. Good music should begin with the people creating the art, not the industry trying to exploit them."

Since Milke got more of a direct say in how the album was handled, he was also able to work as a producer for the record, too. "Collaborating with [recording engineer] Neil Engle is always a pleasure and a dance that he and I have perfected over time," Milke says. "It is a lot of fun to bring a vision to life on your own terms."

This vision that became Confessions will finally let fans know what is to become of Annabel and the storylines she has affected for the last five years. "There are a lot of reveals in this installment," Milke explains of the album's title. "A lot of characters were wearing the sheep's wool and they can no longer stand the deception. Our story, at its core, is about self-recognition. Have you ever actually seen yourself without a mirror? Our characters are all forced to answer that question."

Confessions is set to close a major chapter for the band, one they have been actively pursuing for over half of their decade together. "It is actually fairly bittersweet. To see this trilogy through to its conclusion is very rewarding, and the ending is awesome. However, it is also sad to say goodbye to a character and a concept that we have lived with for so long. Annabel is so layered and rich as a character, literally in some instances. The Annabel Trilogy is a crowning achievement both as a songwriter and as a storyteller."

While Confessions won't be released until April 21, the six-piece will be performing much of their new material live when they hit the road starting April 3. "We will be playing so many songs from the trilogy, including two brand new songs that will be released before the tour. We are very excited for this tour, the package is incredible," Milke notes of the upcoming American shows with Capture the Crown and Revival Recordings label-mates, The Funeral Portrait.

"I can't wait to one day sit down and listen through The Annabel Trilogy in its entirety," Milke concludes, "All of the movements rely on one another. I truly love Confessions and it is my favorite collection we have ever done."

The album debuted at number 47 on Billboard's Top Album Sales and 82 on the Billboard 200.

Alesana has announced that they will release a book entitled "Annabel" on August 31. The short novel will tell the story that the band's three concept albums are based around and a special edition of Confessions with new artwork and two extra songs.

Track listing
All lyrics written by Dennis Lee, Shawn Milke, and Patrick Thompson, all music composed by Alesana.

Personnel
Dennis Lee – unclean vocals, lyrics
Shawn Milke – lead vocals, piano, rhythm guitar 
Patrick Thompson – lead guitar, backing vocals
Jake Campbell – rhythm guitar, backing vocals, lead guitar
Shane Crump – bass, backing vocals
Jeremy Bryan – drums

 Additional musicians
Melissa Milke – female vocals
Daryl Gall – spoken word vocals
Josh Grosscup – Additional vocals on "Fatima Rusalka"

Production
 Neil Engle and Shawn Milke – production

Charts

References

2015 albums
Alesana albums
Concept albums
Rock operas